Nicolaes le Febure (16 April 1589 – 13 July 1641), was a Dutch Golden Age mayor of Haarlem.

Biography
He was the son of Mahu Nicolaesz. of Herzele, and Jannetje Gillis. He became judge, magistrate and mayor and married Margaretha Deyman on 22 September 1612. He was portrayed by Frans Hals in The Banquet of the Officers of the St George Militia Company in 1627. Because he was a dwarf, Hals portrayed him standing so that he appears the same height as the men sitting. The tallest man in the group was positioned behind him however, to accentuate his stature.

On 13 July 1641 he was buried in Haarlem.

References

Nicolaes le Febure in De Haarlemse Schuttersstukken, by Jhr. Mr. C.C. van Valkenburg, pp. 50–51, Haerlem : jaarboek 1961, ISSN 0927-0728, on the website of the North Holland Archives

1589 births
1641 deaths
Frans Hals
People from Haarlem
Mayors of Haarlem
People with dwarfism